Zaid (also transliterated as Zayd) is an Arabic given name and surname.

Zaid

Zaid Abbas Jordanian basketball player
Zaid Abdul-Aziz (born 1946), American basketball player
Zaid Al-Harb (1887–1972), Kuwaiti poet 
Zaid al-Rifai (born 1936), Jordanian politician and prime minister
Zaid Ashkanani (born 1994), Kuwaiti racing driver
Zaid Hamid (born 1964), Pakistani political commentator
Zaid Ibrahim (born 1951), Malaysian politician
Zaid Orudzhev (born 1932), Russian philosopher
Zaid Shakir (born 1956), American scholar
Zaid ibn Shaker (1934–2002), Jordanian general, politician and prime minister

Zayd

Zayd Abu Zayd (1195–1270), Almohad political leader
Zayd al-Khayr, companion of Muhammad
Zayd ibn al-Dathinnah, companion of Muhammad
Zayd ibn Ali (695–740), great-grandson of Ali and fifth Imam according to Zaidi Shi'ism
Zayd ibn al-Khattab, companion of Muhammad
Zayd ibn Arqam, companion of Muhammad
Zayd ibn Harithah (581–629), companion of Muhammad
Zayd ibn Suhan (died 656), companion of Muhammad
Zayd ibn Thabit (610–660), Arab scribe and theologian
Zayd Mutee' Dammaj (1943–2000), Yemeni author and politician
Zayd Saidov (born 1958), Tajik politician
Zayd Salih al-Faqih (born 1964), Yemeni writer

See also
Arabic name
Ziad, an Arabic given name and surname
Zayed (disambiguation)

Arabic-language surnames
Arabic masculine given names
Bosniak masculine given names